Major General Henry Lowrie Davies  (25 January 1898 – 6 July 1975) was a British Indian Army officer, who commanded the 25th Indian Division during the Second World War. Following the Partition of India, he briefly served as Deputy Chief of the General Staff of Pakistan before returning to the United Kingdom to work as a civil servant.

Early life and military career
Davies was born in 1898, to a British Army officer. He was educated at Dover College and the Royal Military College, Sandhurst, before joining the 39th Garhwal Rifles (later the 18th Royal Garhwal Rifles) in India in 1916. He served with them in the Mesopotamian campaign of the First World War and as part of the "Army of the Black Sea" during the Turkish War of Independence. It was for 'distinguished service in the Field with the British Army of the Black Sea' that he was awarded the Military Cross as a captain with the 2/39th Garhwal Rifles.

Returning to British India, he was in service during operations in Waziristan in 1922–23. He attended the Staff College, Quetta from 1928 to 1929. After Quetta, he was then posted as a staff officer grade 3 (GSO.3) to Northern Command. He later became Brigade Major of the Peshawar Brigade, with whom he saw active service during the Mohmand campaign of 1933. It was for 'distinguished service rendered in the field in connection with the military operations against the Upper Mohmands, period July–October 1933' that he was mentioned in dispatches and awarded the Distinguished Service Order. He then returned to senior staff duties, as a GSO.2 at the Military Department of the India Office.

Second World War
In the early stages of the Second World War, he was posted to operations in the North Atlantic as the GSO.1 of the force sent to occupy Iceland. However, he quickly returned to India in 1941, was appointed and Officer of the Order of the British Empire in the London Gazette of 1 July 1941, and in 1942 was appointed as a Brigadier on the General Staff of the Burma Army and Burma Corps. After heavy fighting in the Burma Campaign, the existing Burmese Army had been pushed back to the Indian border and effectively ceased to exist in May 1942. Davies was then appointed to command the newly created 25th Indian Infantry Division, forming in Bangalore to defend southern India against invasion. It trained for jungle operations through 1943, and was deployed during the Third Arakan Campaign in March 1944, pushing south along the Burmese coast. Davies relinquished command of the division in October 1944.

Davies resumed a staff position after leaving the division, appointed as the Deputy Chief of the Indian General Staff. He was appointed a Companion of the Bath as a temporary Major-General in the London Gazette of 13 September 1945. He was promoted to the substantive rank of Major-General with seniority of 15 November 1946 in the London Gazette of 1 April 1947. He then became commandant of the Staff College, Quetta, and following the partition of India transferred to the Pakistan Army as Deputy Chief of the General Staff. He retired the following year in 1948.

Civil Service work
Returning to the United Kingdom, Davies joined the Ministry of Agriculture, Fisheries and Food, where he was assistant director of the investigation division. He remained at the Ministry for fourteen years, before moving to the Historical Section of the Cabinet Office, where he worked as a historian on the Official Histories of the Second World War. He finally retired in 1972.

References

Bibliography

External links
Generals of World War II

|-

1898 births
1975 deaths
Indian Army generals of World War II
Companions of the Order of the Bath
Commanders of the Order of the British Empire
Companions of the Distinguished Service Order
Recipients of the Military Cross
Pakistani generals
British civil servants
Indian Army personnel of World War I
British expatriates in Pakistan
Graduates of the Royal Military College, Sandhurst
Graduates of the Staff College, Quetta
Commandants of the Staff College, Quetta
British Indian Army generals
People educated at Dover College